Dum-Dum is the first full-length album by the alternative rock band The Vaselines, released in 1989. It was recorded at Chamber Studios, Edinburgh, between December 1988 and January 1989. The album was produced by the band and Jamie Watson, and was included in its entirety for their career retrospective The Way of the Vaselines: A Complete History.

The musicians contributing the synthesized strings to "Slushy" and the Indian raga sounds to "Lovecraft" have not been publicly identified. Other songs recorded during the Dum-Dum sessions include "Bitch", "Dying For It (The Blues)" and "Let's Get Ugly". "Teenage Superstars" had already been featured on their 1988 EP Dying for It. The album was re-issed on clear vinyl for Record Store Day in 2018.

Track listing
All tracks written by Kelly and McKee.

Side one
"Sex Sux (Amen)"
"Slushy"
"Monsterpussy"
"Teenage Superstars"
"No Hope"

Side two
"Oliver Twisted"
"The Day I Was A Horse "
"Dum-Dum"
"Hairy"
"Lovecraft"

Personnel

The Vaselines
 Eugene Kelly – vocals, guitars
 Frances McKee – vocals, guitars
 James Seenan – bass
 Charlie Kelly – drums

Additional personnel
 Jamie Watson – engineer; slide guitar on "The Day I Was A Horse"
 Sophie Pragnell – viola on "Oliver Twisted"

References

1989 debut albums
The Vaselines albums
Rough Trade Records albums